Estradiol anthranilate, or estradiol 3-anthranilate, is a synthetic estrogen and estrogen ester – specifically, the C3 anthranilic acid ester of estradiol – which was described in the late 1980s and was never marketed. In dogs, the oral bioavailability of estradiol anthranilate was found to be 5-fold higher than that of unmodified estradiol. However, a subsequent study found that the oral bioavailability of estradiol and estradiol anthranilate did not differ considerably in rats (4.3% and 3.2%, respectively), suggestive of a major species difference.

See also
 List of estrogen esters § Estradiol esters

References

Abandoned drugs
Anthranilic acids
Estradiol esters
Prodrugs